Cyrtograptus is an extinct genus of graptolites.

Cyrtograpsus grayianus was brought to a meeting of the Geological Society of Glasgow and its name was suggested to honour Elizabeth Gray, the woman who found it.

References

Graptolite genera
Index fossils
Paleozoic life of British Columbia
Paleozoic life of the Northwest Territories
Paleozoic life of Nunavut